Layton Township is a township in Pottawattamie County, Iowa, USA.

History
Layton Township was established in 1873.

References

Townships in Pottawattamie County, Iowa
Townships in Iowa